Oportuzumab monatox is an experimental anti-cancer medication. Chemically, oportuzumab is a single chain variable fragment of a monoclonal antibody which binds to epithelial cell adhesion molecule (EpCAM, the tumor-associated calcium signal transducer 1). Oportuzumab is fused with Pseudomonas aeruginosa exotoxin A (which is reflected by the monatox in the medication's name).

The drug was developed by Canadian-based Viventia Bio Inc. The company was acquired by Cambridge(MA)-based Eleven Biotherapeutics in 2016, which then changed its name to  Sesen Bio.
In 2019 Sesen Bio reported updated, preliminary primary and secondary endpoint data from the company's Phase 3 VISTA trial further supporting the strong benefit-risk profile of Vicineum for the potential treatment of patients with high-risk, bacillus Calmette-Guérin(BCG) unresponsive, non-muscle invasive bladder cancer (NMIBC). The Company applied for approval of Vicineum by the United States Food and Drug Administration and the European Medicines Agency.

References

Vol 24, No 18S (June 20 Supplement), 2006: 4580

Antibody-drug conjugates
Experimental cancer drugs
Monoclonal antibodies for tumors